Marwan Ali is a Tunisian pop singer, the winner of the Arab Super Star show, a version of the British show Pop Idol.

SuperStar is broadcast on Future TV, a Lebanese television station and is the first Idol franchise to feature contestants from multiple countries.

Marwan, an 18-year-old student at the time, won the fourth season of SuperStarcompetition broadcast from 22 January to 4 June 2007, against 12 other late-stage participants from Lebanon, Tunisia, Morocco, Egypt and Syria. His competitors in the final show were Saad Lamjarred from Morocco and Yousra Mahnouch from Tunisia. His prizes included a new car from Ford, and a recording contract to help launch his debut album.

He released his first single "Rah Ghany" in 2009.

References 

Living people
21st-century Tunisian male singers
SuperStar (Arabic TV series)
Contestants from Arabic singing competitions
Idols (TV series) winners
Year of birth missing (living people)